Eternity is the seventh studio album by Danish soft rock band Michael Learns to Rock. It was released on October 27, 2008 through MLTR Music and At:tack Music. This is the first Michael Learns to Rock album to have been solely produced by Mikkel Lentz, except the tracks "Family Tree" and "Lonely Satellite". "Family Tree" was previously recorded by Danish pop duo Brother+Sister for their second album, Sonny vs. Gigi in 2002. The song "It's Gonna Make Sense" was a very popular hit in the Philippines since this was the trademark song for every eviction in Pinoy Big Brother: Double Up, and in India, it featured on the soundtrack to the Indian film Welcome M1LL10NS. The song "Sweetest Surprise" reached number one in Thailand.

Track listing

Eternity & Beyond

Charts

References

External links
Official website

2008 albums
Michael Learns to Rock albums